Religious clothing is clothing which is worn in accordance with religious practice, tradition or significance to a faith group. It includes clerical clothing such as cassocks, and religious habit, robes, and other vestments. Accessories include hats, wedding rings, crucifixes, etc.

Christianity

 
Vestments are liturgical garments and articles associated primarily with the Christian religions, especially Catholic, Eastern Orthodox, Anglicans, Methodists, and Lutheran Churches. Other groups also make use of vestments, but this was a point of controversy in the Protestant Reformation and sometimes since - notably during the Ritualist controversies in England in the 19th century. Clerical clothing is non-liturgical clothing worn exclusively by clergy. It is distinct from vestments in that it is not reserved specifically for services.

Women belonging to various Christian denominations (such as those of Conservative Anabaptist Christianity and Orthodox Christianity) practice Christian headcovering, a traditional practice since the days of the early Church. Additionally, some Christians practice the wearing of plain dress, notably traditional Anabaptists (such as Old Order Mennonites and Conservative Mennonites), Conservative Friends, and Methodists of the conservative holiness movement; for example, in its 2015 Book of Discipline, the Evangelical Wesleyan Church teaches that:

Latter Day Saint movement
Adherents of the Church of Jesus Christ of Latter-day Saints (LDS Church) and some fundamentalist Latter Day Saint groups often receive temple garments at the time of receiving their endowment, after taking part in the endowment ritual. These garments, which are to be worn at all times (with the exception of certain activities such as exercise) under typical clothing, date back to the early days of the Church, originating with the Church's first latter-day prophet, Joseph Smith, Jr., and have been updated periodically. Members believe that wearing these garments can are meant to serve as a symbolic reminder of eternal covenants they have made with God the Father and Jesus Christ. Special outer temple clothing is also worn for worship and participation in temple ceremonies. Temple clothing is not worn outside of the temples, with an exception for deceased members who may be dressed in temple clothing for burial.

Outside of temples, including at weekly sacrament meetings and at general conferences, respectful clothing is traditionally worn, often with a white, button-down shirt, and a tie for the male members, females typically wear a dress or skirt, emphasizing "modesty" in appearance. White clothes are worn by those undergoing and performing baptism.

Islam

Dress in Islam varies from country to country. The Quranic sura  ("The Light") prescribes modesty in dress. Various hadiths (teachings of Muhammad) state further criteria for women's dress code and men's dress code in Islam.

The hijab is recommended for women in the Quran, which says: "O Prophet, tell your wives and your daughters and the women of the believers to bring down over themselves [part] of their outer garments. That is more suitable that they will be known and not be abused. And ever is Allah Forgiving and Merciful."

The hijab is commonly worn throughout the Islamic world, with many Muslim countries having adapted it to their culture and traditions. For example, there are Muslim countries like Turkey where only a headscarf is common; however, this does not mean that the niqab, burqa or khimar are not worn. In Saudi Arabia, the hijab, niqab, the khimar and the burqa are typical. In Afghanistan and parts of Pakistan, the burqa and the niqab are both common. In India, particularly in the state of Kashmir, Muslim women wear the hijab and the khimar. In Sudan, Indonesia and Malaysia, the hijab, the khimar and the jilbab are more common.

Judaism

Tzitzit are specially knotted ritual fringes, or tassels worn by most Jewish men and boys during prayer. Tzitzit are attached to the four corners of the tallit (Jewish prayer shawl) and in more traditional communities are tied to all four-cornered garments.

Tefillin are black leather boxes made by hand which contain written passages from the Hebrew Bible, particularly the V'ahavta and secured to the arm and head with leather straps. These have been worn for at least the last 2,000 years and originated in pre-diaspora Judaism. These are almost exclusively worn by very religious Jews during weekday prayers, and not worn outside of religious functions in order to prevent one from 'defiling' them. Curiously, while Ashkenazi and some Sephardi men have the custom to wear these during prayer, many outlying communities such as the Beta Israel did not, until they were introduced to the custom by Israelis or Ashkenazi missionaries.

A kippah or yarmulke is a cloth head covering worn by Jews during prayer or other ritual services. Some wear it every day. In the United States, most synagogues and Jewish funeral services keep a ready supply of kippot for the temporary use of visitors who have not brought one.

It is customary for a married woman, but some women choose to wear them only during religious occasions.

Fedoras, generally black with a wide brim, are worn by men from Litvish, Yeshivish, and Chabad-Lubavitch communities, and these are worn by both single and married men. Homburg style hats are often worn by rabbis of higher rank in Litvish and Yeshivish circles. Derby hats are worn by Hasidic men in certain communities, sometimes signifying lay status as opposed to rabbinical status. In Mizrachi communities, these are replaced by the more traditional sudra, or otherwise a turban typically wrapped from a modified keffiyeh. Other communities wear hats similar to the fez or the more common Bucharian styled .

 coats are worn by Hasidic lay men during weekdays, and by some on the Sabbath.

Some Ashkenazi Jewish men wear a frock coat during prayer and other specific occasions. It is commonly worn by Hasidic rabbis and Jewish religious leaders in public.

 coats or robes are worn by Hasidic lay men on Sabbath and holidays, both single and married. In some non-Hasidic communities a  may be worn either during prayer or at meals as well, on the Sabbath and holidays. The  worn by certain rabbis may have colors other than black, such as white, silver, gold, or blue, and may also be lined with velvet.

The  is a white robe worn on certain occasions by married men (and some women) in Ashkenazic and Hasidic communities, such as Yom Kippur and Passover Seder, and may be worn by those leading prayers (and in some communities by all married men) on Rosh Hashanah, Hoshanah Rabbah, and for Tefilas Tal and Tefilas Geshem. A groom will generally wear a  during his wedding ceremony as well. In some Sephardic communities, a rabbi or a  may wear a similar white robe at weddings and at prayer services.

The gartel is a belt used by some Jewish men during prayer, particularly from Hasidic communities. "Gartel" is Yiddish for "belt." In older traditional Jewish communities, sashes were worn for the same effect, though non-European traditional clothing has fallen out of favor in Israel, and therefore most of these communities.

Wearing a thin red string (as a type of talisman) is a custom, popularly thought to be associated with Judaism's Kabbalah, in order to ward off misfortune brought about by an "evil eye"  ( in Hebrew). The red string itself is usually made from thin red wool thread. It is worn, or tied, as a type of bracelet or "band" on the left wrist of the wearer (the receiving side). The connection to traditional Judaism is disputed, and this is mostly worn by secular or non-Jewish spiritualist circles who often misunderstand the origins, or were sold manufactured versions within popular Israeli religious tourist attractions.

Sikhism

Baptized Khalsa Sikhs are mandated to wear the 5 Ks: Kesh (unshorn hair), strapped Kirpan (sword), Kachhehra (prescribed shorts), Kanga (Comb tucked in the tied up hair), Karha (Steel bracelet). He/she must not have on his/her person any token of any other faith. He/she must not have his/her head bare or be wearing a cap. He/she must not be wearing any ornaments piercing through any part of the body.

Hair is seen as sacred. Hair cutting, trimming, removing, shaving, plucking, threading, dyeing, or any other alteration from any body part is strictly forbidden.

In addition to this, every Sikh man is supposed to wear a turban, while it is optional for women. Piercing of the nose or ears for wearing ornaments is forbidden for Sikh men and women. It is not proper for a Sikh woman to wear veil or keep her face hidden by veil or cover.

Interreligious

A Peace Mala is a symbolic bracelet used to promote the message of the Golden Rule of mutual respect recognised by many spiritual paths. It consists of 16 beads, forming a double rainbow, which represent Christianity, Buddhism, Sikhism, Islam, Judaism, Baháʼí, ISKCON, Zoroastrianism, Tribal and Native Religions, Jainism, Earth Religions, Taoism, Hinduism and Yungdrung Bön, with the central white bead representing the wearer and whatever path they may follow.

In protest
During the George Floyd Protests of 2020, clergy and religious leaders of various faiths wore purple reflective vests as a symbol of their religious witness, sometimes in addition to other religious clothing.

Gallery

See also

References